René Leblanc is a justice with the Federal Court of Appeal of Canada.

References 

Living people
Judges of the Federal Court of Canada
Year of birth missing (living people)